The 2020 season was Penangs 94th competitive season, 3rd consecutive season in the second tier of Malaysian football  since relegated in 2017, and 99th year in existence as a football club. The season covers the period from 1 December 2019 to 30 November 2020. After spending the season mostly at the top of the league table, Penang were promoted to the Super League on 20 September. Two weeks later, Penang won the Malaysia Premier League for the first time in the club's history after Kuala Lumpur failed to get three points against Perak II.

Coaching Staffs

Squad

 FP = Foreign player
 U21 = Under-21 player

Transfers and contracts

In

1st Transfer Window

Out

1st Transfer Window

Friendlies

Edy Rahmayadi Cup 2020

Competitions

Malaysia Premier League

League table

Result summary

Results by matchday

Matches

Malaysia FA Cup

Notes:'''

   2020 Season cancelled due to the 2020 Coronavirus Pandemic.

Malaysia CupNotes:'   2020 Season cancelled due to the 2020 Coronavirus Pandemic.

Statistics
Appearances and goals

Top scorersThe list is sorted by shirt number when total goals are equal.Top assists
An assist is credited to a player for passing or crossing the ball to the scorer, a player whose shot rebounds (off a defender, goalkeeper or goalpost) to a teammate who scores, and a player who wins a penalty kick or a free kick for another player to convert. The list is sorted by shirt number when total goals are equal.Clean sheetsThe list is sorted by shirt number when total clean sheets are equal.''

Summary

References

2020
Penang F.C.
Penang